Ray Abruzzo (born August 12, 1954) is an American actor. He is best known for his role as Little Carmine Lupertazzi in The Sopranos, Detective Michael McGuire in The Practice (1998-2004), and Tony Giuliano in Night Court (1989-1991).

Early life
Abruzzo was born in Queens, New York City on August 12, 1954. He is a graduate of Christ the King Regional High School in Middle Village, Queens, New York.

Career
Abruzzo played police sergeant John Zorelli in 20 episodes of Dynasty from 1988 to 1989; Detective Michael McGuire in 44 episodes of The Practice from 1998 to 2004; and "Little" Carmine Lupertazzi in 16 episodes of The Sopranos from 2002 to 2007. He also played the part of Tony Guiliano, Christine Sullivan's fiancé, husband, and then ex-husband in several episodes of the sitcom Night Court.

Other television credits include a 1989 episode of Empty Nest, where he played cardiologist Dr. Leonard, NCIS, Murder, She Wrote, L.A. Law, House M.D., NYPD Blue, Lois and Clark, Law & Order: SVU, The Nanny, CSI: NY, Criminal Minds, Bones, Weinerville (head writer, stage manager, and performed as the puppet chef Pops), In Plain Sight and Mad Men.

He was seen on the stage of the Pasadena Playhouse in the play, Mauritius, by Theresa Rebeck. He also played the title role in Lombardi.

Abruzzo starred in the longest single shot movie in American film history, Somebody Marry Me, written and directed by John Asher.

He is a supporter of SENS Research Foundation, a nonprofit organization dedicated to researching and treating the causes of aging.

Filmography

Film

Television

References

External links

1954 births
Living people
American male television actors
American people of Italian descent